Spartak Elmazi (3 December 1987 – 19 December 2021) was an Albanian footballer who played as a midfielder. He died on 19 December 2021, at the age of 34.

References

1987 births
2021 deaths
Footballers from Korçë
Albanian footballers
Association football midfielders
KS Pogradeci players
FK Tomori Berat players
KS Kastrioti players
KF Adriatiku Mamurrasi players
FK Dinamo Tirana players
FC Kamza players
Kategoria Superiore players
Kategoria e Parë players